Street Warriors (original title ) is a Spanish film from 1977 directed by , known for being the first film of the  ("delinquency cinema") genre that was popular in Spain at the end of the 1970s and in the 1980s. The story is inspired by the adventures of the famous delinquent  (1961–2003; also known as ).

Plot
The film is about a gang of teenage car thieves from the suburbs of Barcelona. The delinquents have various run-ins with the law and mistreat women. The main character, El Torete, is 15 years old.

Cast
The main actors were not professional actors. The cast included:

Reception
The film was a box office hit.

Fernando Trueba writing for El País said that while the cinematography was terrible that the film had a strong feel of authenticity.

Cinemanía describes the film as having aged very badly, while still being a good reflection of the times.

Later films
Perros callejeros is the first in a trilogy:

 Perros callejeros (1977)
Perros callejeros II (1978)
 Los últimos golpes de El Torete (1980)
In total the director made a series of five quinqui films. The other in the series are:
 Yo, el Vaquilla (1985)
 Perras callejeras (1985)

References

External link
 

1970s action films
1977 films
Spanish action films
Hood films
1970s Spanish-language films